Templar House was a high-rise flat (apartment) building in the New Lodge neighbourhood of Belfast, Northern Ireland, notable for its controversial role as a British Army observation post during The Troubles in Northern Ireland. The post included high-technology observation devices such as electronic monitoring equipment, cameras, and night vision.

The location of the outpost provoked demonstrations against it by the Irish Republican community.

References

Buildings and structures in Belfast